Eophacops is a genus of trilobites from the order Phacopida, family Phacopidae. These trilobites lived during the Middle Silurian in what now are North America and North-West Europe. Species assigned to this genus can be distinguished from Phacops by their small size (2–3 cm). Eophacops has very large eyes compared to the rest of its body.

References 

Silurian trilobites of Europe
Phacopidae
Silurian trilobites of North America
Ordovician first appearances
Silurian extinctions
Paleozoic life of British Columbia
Paleozoic life of Nunavut
Paleozoic life of Quebec